Meladeia is a village in the Paphos District of Cyprus, located 2 km southwest of Lysos. In the direction of the Paphos forest, the visitor will come across Medeladeia, one of the small settlements of Magnolia, surrounded by the villages of Lysos, Peristerona Paphos and Melandra.

In the wider area of Meladeia there are many accommodation for accommodation, while in the sparsely populated settlement there is still a ruined mosque, a living proof of the settlement's history.

Elevation 
Meladeia has an elevation of 545 m above sea level.

References

Communities in Paphos District